Emily Clark Hewitt (born May 26, 1944) is a former judge and chief judge of the United States Court of Federal Claims.

Early life
Hewitt was born in Baltimore, Maryland. She graduated from the Roland Park Country School in Baltimore and in 1966, she earned an A.B. from Cornell University. She received an M.Phil. degree from the Union Theological Seminary in New York City in studies focusing on religion and education, and was ordained to the diaconate of the Episcopal Church in 1972.

Career

Episcopal church and early career
Hewitt is considered a leader of the effort to open Episcopal ordination to women.  Hewitt was one of the Philadelphia Eleven, the first eleven women ordained to the Episcopal priesthood on July 29, 1974. Hewitt served from 1973–1975 as assistant professor of religion and education at Andover Newton Theological School in Newton Centre, Massachusetts. She has also served as lecturer at the Union Theological Seminary and, from 1967 to 1969, as administrator of the Cornell/Hofstra Upward Bound Program at the Union Settlement House in East Harlem. She graduated with honors from Harvard Law School in 1978, where she was a member of the Harvard Legal Aid Bureau. She also holds a D.Min. degree from the Chicago Theological Seminary for studies focusing on liberty of conscience.

Law practice
Hewitt practiced from 1978 to 1993 with the Boston law firm Hill & Barlow. She was made a partner in 1985, and served as chair of Hill & Barlow's real estate department from 1987 to 1993. While with Hill & Barlow, Hewitt served on charitable, civic, and professional boards and committees and as a continuing education lecturer on real estate law.

Federal government work
Hewitt served as General Counsel of the United States General Services Administration from 1993 to 1998, overseeing the legal activities and responsibilities of the agency. She served as GSA's chief ethics official, as chief legal advisor to the Administrator and other GSA officials, and as a member of GSA's management committee. While at GSA, Hewitt served as a government member of the Administrative Conference of the United States and as a member of the President's Interagency Council on Women. She also served as a continuing education lecturer on procurement law reform, procurement integrity, alternative dispute resolution, and government law office management.

Federal judicial service
Hewitt was commissioned as a judge of the United States Court of Federal Claims by President Bill Clinton on October 22, 1998. In 2006, she was appointed by Chief Justice John G. Roberts to serve on the Financial Disclosure Committee of the Judicial Conference of the United States. President Barack Obama designated Hewitt to serve as Chief Judge on March 11, 2009. She served as chief judge until President Obama designated Patricia E. Campbell-Smith to serve as Chief Judge on October 21, 2013 at which time Hewitt's term as chief judge and 15-year term as a judge of the Court ended.

Personal life
In addition to hundreds of legal opinions, Hewitt is the author or co-author of more than two dozen publications on legal and religious topics. Hewitt is an accomplished long distance race walker. She won a U.S. national race walking medal in 1987 and has won many national masters medals. She has walked more than a dozen marathons including the Boston, New York and United States Marine Corps Marathons. She is also an avid hiker of the National Park trails of the American West.

Hewitt is married to Eleanor D. Acheson (born 1947), who served as Assistant Attorney General of the United States during the Clinton Administration. Acheson is the daughter of David Campion Acheson (born 1921), a lawyer who worked on the United States Atomic Energy Commission and served as an assistant to former Treasury secretary Henry H. Fowler, and the granddaughter of lawyer and former Secretary of State Dean Acheson (1893–1971) and his wife Alice (1895–1996).

See also 
 List of LGBT jurists in the United States

References
Material in this article was copied from the website of the United States Court of Federal Claims, a publication of the United States government in the public domain.

External links 

 
Official Congressional Directory: 113th Congress

|-

1944 births
Living people
20th-century American Episcopalians
20th-century American judges
20th-century American lawyers
20th-century American women lawyers
21st-century American judges
American Episcopal priests
Andover Newton Theological School faculty
Chicago Theological Seminary alumni
Cornell University alumni
Harvard Law School alumni
Judges of the United States Court of Federal Claims
Lawyers from Baltimore
LGBT Anglican clergy
LGBT appointed officials in the United States
LGBT judges
LGBT lawyers
LGBT people from Maryland
United States Article I federal judges appointed by Bill Clinton
Union Theological Seminary (New York City) alumni
Union Theological Seminary (New York City) faculty
Women Anglican clergy